Jacques Trovic (June 15, 1948 -  October 27, 2018) was a French artist. Active from the 1960s, he creates tapestries using sewing and embroidery techniques on popular or folklore themes. He is generally considered as belonging to the Outsider Art movement.

Biography 
Jacques Trovic was born in Anzin, a mining town near Valenciennes in the North of France. Due to health issues, he attends school intermittently. He learned embroidery and sewing with his mother and two sisters, who were seamstresses. As a teenager, he attends the art school of Saint-Amand-les-Eaux. He lived in Anzin for most of his life, and spent his later years la Pommeraie in Belgium.

Works

Tapestries 
Trovic's principal themes and subjects are the mining culture of the North of France (La Jonction souterraine i[The Underground Junction], 1975), the folklore, traditional crafts (Le Cordonnier [The Shoemaker]), quotidian life (Le Marchand de ballons [The Seller of Balloons], 1974) or French regions,.

Trovic's tapestries use hessian fabric, and are generally several meters in size, which he progressively covered with pieces of fabric and embroideries.

Catalogs and illustrated books 

 Musique en fêtes, exhibition catalog, 1999
 Le Petit Mousseron, by André Dubuc, illustrated by Jacques Trovic, 2004.

Collections 
His work is exhibited in several museums and organisations dedicated to Outsider art.

Notes and references

External links 

 In 2021 the TRANS-ARTS association (Lille - France) continues its documentary project "Les Solèls de Trovic" which will be released in early 2023. The website of the project contains a wealth of information on the artist, biography, analysis, research and investigations ... A publication resulting from a part of the research for the writing of the film : Les Solèls de Trovic, the documentary (EN)
 Other documentaries about Jacques Trovic, notably available online : "Le Monde de Trovic" June 30, 2014, Documentary by Jean Michel Zazzi dedicated to Jacques Trovic. "Film Jacques Trovic" December 21, 2015, documentary by Boris Beaudenon (Le Film à Retordre)

1948 births
2018 deaths
20th-century French male artists
Outsider artists
French embroiderers